Look Who's Talking Now is a 1993 American romantic comedy film, and the third and final installment in the film series that began with Look Who's Talking in 1989. It finds John Travolta and Kirstie Alley reprising their roles as James and Mollie Ubriacco, respectively, and introducing the newly extended family members to it.

David Gallagher and Tabitha Lupien portray Mikey and Julie respectively. Unlike the previous films, it does not feature the voiceover talents of Bruce Willis, Roseanne Barr, or Joan Rivers as their interior monologues; rather, Danny DeVito and Diane Keaton provide voiceover roles for their newly acquired dogs, Rocks and Daphne, respectively, and it focuses more on their lives. Lysette Anthony and Olympia Dukakis costar. George Segal and Charles Barkley have cameo roles.

The film was released on November 5, 1993, by TriStar Pictures. It received negative reviews from critics and underperformed at the box office, grossing $10.3 million against a production budget of $22 million.

Plot
A puppy who needs an owner, and is talking, sees Mikey passing by and begs him to take him home. Mikey, however, has to hurry past in tow of his mother, so other people take him. He manages to escape and starts his life as a stray. 

James is a pilot working for Samantha - who extends trips to spend more time with him. Mollie is looking for a job after getting laid off. Mikey tells Santa Claus that he wants a dog for Christmas, James feels the time has come to give him one and tells Samantha. 

One day, the dog gets caught by a catcher and taken to a kennel. He is about to be put down when James brings Mikey there to select one. Overjoyed, he bumps into the dog he saw as a puppy and decides to take him home. He names him Rocks.

When they get home, they see Samantha is there with her highly trained dog Daphne, who wants James to have her as a present. Rocks and Daphne do not get along. Rocks is messy and untrained while Daphne is well-trained and spoiled. However, Daphne bonds with Julie while Rocks does with Mikey. Rocks wears Mollie's patience due to his behavior, leaving her to clean up after his messes. 

Samantha starts having James fly on long trips. Mollie has to job hunt and take care of the kids and dogs. James and Mollie develop tensions over Samantha, she suspects that James is cheating on her.

James states he has faith in his wife and wants her to have faith in him. She agrees but still distrusts Samantha's intentions. After another trip, both have dreams of the other being unfaithful. James and Mollie are still in love with each other and miss one another while they are apart. As Mollie becomes more tired, Daphne realizes that she needs to become more independent. Rocks helps her learn how to go outside by herself and use her sense of smell to track people or things. The dogs start becoming friends. 

On Christmas Eve, Samantha tricks James into coming to fancy cabin in the woods by saying that she wants to introduce him to a prospective client. She stalls for time until James cannot leave because of a snowstorm. James calls Mollie to tell her that he cannot make it home for Christmas. Mollie learns that he is alone with Samantha and becomes worried he is going to cheat on her. However, Mollie's mother convinces her to trust her instincts that James loves her and would never do that.

Mollie drives through the storm with the kids and dogs to "bring Christmas to Daddy". Their car gets stuck in the woods due to the storm. They are attacked by a wolf, and Rocks scares them off while Mollie and the kids get inside the car. Daphne sets out to find help using the tracking skills that Rocks taught her.

Rocks runs out to track down James on his own. He finds Samantha's cabin, and James realizes that Mollie has set out to find him. He confronts Samantha about her lies and quits his job, then goes with Rocks to track down his family. They are attacked by wolves, and Rocks fights them off while James escapes. 

Meanwhile, Daphne finds a forest ranger that takes Mollie, the kids, and Daphne to safety into his cabin. James finds them, and Rocks runs in. Then James tells Mollie that if it wasn't for Rocks he would've not even made it and then Mollie says he stays so James and Mollie carry Mikey and Julie to bed to wait for Santa.

Cast

Production
Unlike the previous films, the children no longer have voiceovers for their inner thoughts, since they are now old enough to talk for themselves. Danny DeVito and Diane Keaton portray the Ubriaccos' dogs. This also marked the film debuts of Tabitha Lupien, and David Gallagher, best known for his later role as Simon Camden on 7th Heaven. Charles Barkley makes a cameo appearance as himself.

George Segal, who portrayed Albert, the first film's antagonist and Mikey's biological father, reappears briefly. Both Twink Caplan, who portrayed Mollie's best friend, Rona, in the previous two films, and Elias Koteas, who portrayed Mollie's brother, Stuart, in the second film, declined to return for this film.

French singer Jordy performs, alongside David Gallagher, Tabitha Lupien, and other children, in a special music video for the film, titled It's Christmas, C'est Noel, from the album of Christmas, Potion Magique.

Release
The film was released in the United Kingdom on May 27, 1994.

Reception
The site's critical consensus simply reads "Look Who's Talking Now: Look away". At Metacritic, which assigns a weighted average score out of 100 with reviews from mainstream critics, the film received an average score of 26 based on 19 reviews, indicating "generally unfavorable reviews". Roger Ebert gave the film one star out of four and remarked that "it looks like it was chucked up by an automatic screenwriting machine". Gene Siskel gave the film zero stars and called it "an abysmal, embarrassing sequel". Audiences polled by CinemaScore gave the film an average grade of "B+" on an A+ to F scale.

Dan Cox of Variety wrote: "Stretching a premise that one might say has gone to the dogs, Look Who's Talking Now runs feebly on the calculated steam of its forebears". Rita Kempley of The Washington Post wrote: "Take the 'dle' out of 'poodle' and you've pretty much got the leitmotif of Look Who's Talking Now, a crude and mawkish film in which dogs attempt to communicate with Kirstie Alley and John Travolta".

Stephen Holden of The New York Times was somewhat positive, writing that "the sound of stars mouthing the inner thoughts of dogs is somehow funnier than that of grownup actors doing wisecracking voice overs for gurgling infants". Peter Rainer of the Los Angeles Times was also somewhat positive, calling the film "borderline pleasant" because Travolta and Alley "are a marvelous team".

Leonard Maltin's film guide gave it two stars out of four, saying "the first one was cute, the second one was dreadful; this third entry in the series falls somewhere in between".

Box office
Look Who's Talking Now was a box office bomb, only earning over $10 million against its $22 million budget, making it the lowest-grossing film in the series. In its opening week, the film also faced stiff competition for an audience from The Nightmare Before Christmas.

See also
 List of Christmas films

References

External links

 
 

1993 films
1990s children's comedy films
American children's comedy films
American Christmas films
American sequel films
Films set in New York City
Films shot in Toronto
Films shot in Vancouver
TriStar Pictures films
Films about dogs
Films scored by William Ross
1990s Christmas films
American Christmas comedy films
1993 comedy films
1990s English-language films
Films about children
1990s American films